Ctenotrachelus is a genus of assassin bugs in the family Reduviidae. There are more than 20 described species in Ctenotrachelus.

Species
These 21 species belong to the genus Ctenotrachelus:

 Ctenotrachelus acarinatus Maldonado, 1995-01
 Ctenotrachelus achilloides Bérenger, 2001-01
 Ctenotrachelus acutus Barber, 1930
 Ctenotrachelus elongatus Barber, 1930
 Ctenotrachelus esuriens Hussey, 1954
 Ctenotrachelus infuscatus Barber, 1930
 Ctenotrachelus kwataensis Bérenger, 2001-01
 Ctenotrachelus lobatus Barber, 1930
 Ctenotrachelus longicollis (Walker, 1873)
 Ctenotrachelus macilentus Stål, 1872
 Ctenotrachelus mexicanus (Champion, 1898)
 Ctenotrachelus minor Barber, 1929
 Ctenotrachelus moraguesi Bérenger, 2001-01
 Ctenotrachelus orbiculatus Bérenger, 2001-01
 Ctenotrachelus pallidopodus Maldonado, 1955
 Ctenotrachelus ranchoensis Maldonado, 1974
 Ctenotrachelus setulosus Barber, 1930
 Ctenotrachelus shermani Barber, 1930
 Ctenotrachelus striatus Barber, 1930
 Ctenotrachelus testaceus Barber, 1929
 Ctenotrachelus vescoi Bérenger, 2001-01

References

Further reading

 
 
 

Reduviidae
Articles created by Qbugbot